Kiryat Ono is a city in the Tel Aviv District of Israel.

Modern Kiryat Ono is not to be confused with the biblical Ono, which was located in the area that is now Or Yehuda.

History

During the 18th and 19th centuries, the area of Kiryat Ono belonged to the Nahiyeh (sub-district) of Lod that encompassed the area of the present-day city of Modi'in-Maccabim-Re'ut in the south to the present-day city of El'ad in the north, and from the foothills in the east, through the Lod Valley to the outskirts of Jaffa in the west. This area was home to thousands of inhabitants in about 20 villages, who had at their disposal tens of thousands of hectares of prime agricultural land.

A settlement named Kfar Ono was established in 1939. During the 1950s, a ma'abara (transit camp for new immigrants in Israel) was established nearby. In 1954, the settlement merged with other communities to form Kiryat Ono. It achieved city status in 1992.

In a park a lone sycamore tree stands on a hill overlooking the Tel HaShomer base; this tree has been adopted as the city's spiritual and cultural icon. The lands surrounding the tree were owned as agricultural land and maintained by Aryeh Konikov.  When the lone tree was planted, it seemed unique in its location, and Mr. Konikov nourished it and maintained the land surrounding it for many years. That land has now become a part of park named Ricefield.

Demographics

According to CBS, in 2001 the ethnic makeup of the city was Jewish and other non-Arabs.  Kiryat Ono has grown significantly in recent years. According to CBS, in 2014 there were 17,700 males and 18,900 females. The population of the city was spread out, with 32.4% 19 years of age or younger, 9.8% between 20 and 29, 24.3% between 30 and 44, 14.9% from 45 to 59, 5.0% from 60 to 64, and 13.6% 65 years of age or older. The population growth rate in 2014 was 3.0%.

Income
According to CBS, as of 2013, in the city, there were 16,400 salaried workers and 1,417 are self-employed. The mean monthly wage in 2013 for a salaried worker in the city is ILS 12,543, a real change of 0.6% over the course of 2012. Salaried males have a mean monthly wage of ILS 15,487 (a real change of 1.0%) versus ILS 9,877 for females (a real change of 0.9%). The mean income for the self-employed is 12,598. There are 282 people who receive unemployment benefits and 162 people who receive an income guarantee.

Education
There are 11 schools in the city:7 state elementary schools (Alumim, Rimonim, Warsaw, Nir, Jacob Cohen, and Sharett), 1 religious state elementary school, 1 Democratic school, 3 middle schools (Shazar, Ben Zvi and Peres Junior High) and 1 high school. (Ben Zvi High school) 6,465 pupils study at the schools. 

Ono Academic College, an accredited private college with 8,500 students is located in Kiryat Ono.

International relations

Twin towns
Kiryat Ono is twinned with:
 Ioannina, Greece
 Smallingerland, Netherlands
 Dormagen, Germany
 Offenbach (district), Germany

Notable people
 Abigail and Marc-Daniel Aroyo, children murdered in a 1971 terrorist attack
 Gilad Erdan (born 1970), politician
 Eyal Ran (born 1972), tennis player
 Lavih Serfaty (born 1945), artist and author
 Shez (born 1959), poet, writer, playwright, singer, and songwriter
 Yona Wallach (1944–1985), poet

References

External links

Official website 

Cities in Israel
Cities in Tel Aviv District
Populated places established in 1939
1939 establishments in Mandatory Palestine